The German Mathematical Society (DMV) is the main professional society of German mathematicians and represents German mathematics within the European Mathematical Society (EMS) and the International Mathematical Union (IMU). It was founded in 1890 in Bremen with the set theorist Georg Cantor as first president. Founding members included 
Georg Cantor, 
Felix Klein, 
Walther von Dyck,
David Hilbert, 
Hermann Minkowski, 
Carl Runge, 
Rudolf Sturm, 
Hermann Schubert, and 
Heinrich Weber.

The current president of the DMV is Ilka Agricola (2021–2022).

Activities

In honour of its founding president, Georg Cantor, the society awards the Cantor Medal. The DMV publishes two scientific journals, the Jahresbericht der DMV and Documenta Mathematica. It also publishes a quarterly magazine for its membership the Mitteilungen der DMV. The annual meeting of the DMV is called the Jahrestagung; the DMV traditionally meets every four years together with the Austrian Mathematical Society (ÖMG) and every four years together with the Gesellschaft für Didaktik der Mathematik (GDM). It sometimes organises its meetings jointly with other societies (e.g., 2014 with the Polish Mathematical Society, PTM, or 2016 with the Gesellschaft für Angewandte Mathematik und Mechanik, GAMM).
Twice annually, it organises the Gauß Lecture, a public audience lecture by well-known mathematicians.

Cantor Medal

Governance

Since 1995, the DMV is led by a president, before that by a chairperson.

 1890–1893: Georg Cantor
 1894: Paul Gordan
 1895, 1904: Heinrich Weber
 1896, 1907: Alexander von Brill
 1897, 1903 und 1908: Felix Klein
 1898: Aurel Voss
 1899: Max Noether
 1900: David Hilbert
 1901, 1912: Walther von Dyck
 1902: Wilhelm Franz Meyer
 1905: Paul Stäckel
 1906: Alfred Pringsheim
 1909: Martin Krause, Dresden
 1910: Friedrich Engel
 1911: Friedrich Schur
 1913: Karl Rohn
 1914: Carl Runge
 1915: Sebastian Finsterwalder
 1916: Ludwig Kiepert
 1917: Kurt Hensel
 1918: Otto Hölder
 1919: Hans von Mangoldt
 1920: Robert Fricke
 1921: Edmund Landau
 1922: Arthur Moritz Schoenflies
 1923: Erich Hecke
 1924: Otto Blumenthal
 1925: Heinrich Tietze
 1926: Hans Hahn
 1927: Friedrich Schilling, Danzig
 1928, 1936: Erhard Schmidt
 1929: Adolf Kneser
 1930: Rudolf Rothe, Berlin
 1931: Ernst Sigismund Fischer
 1932: Hermann Weyl
 1933: Richard Baldus
 1934: Oskar Perron
 1935: Georg Hamel
 1937: Walther Lietzmann
 1938–1945: Wilhelm Süss
 1946: Kurt Reidemeister
 1948–1952: Erich Kamke
 1953, 1955: Georg Nöbeling
 1954: Hellmuth Kneser
 1956: Karl Heinrich Weise
 1957: Emanuel Sperner
 1958: Gottfried Köthe
 1959: Willi Rinow
 1960: Wilhelm Maak
 1961: Ott-Heinrich Keller
 1962: Friedrich Hirzebruch
 1963: Wolfgang Haack
 1964–1965: Heinrich Behnke
 1966: Karl Stein
 1967: Wolfgang Franz
 1968–1977: Martin Barner
 1977: Heinz Bauer
 1978, 1979: Hermann Witting
 1980–1981: Gerd Fischer
 1982–1983: Helmut Werner, Bonn
 1984–1985: Albrecht Dold
 1986–1987: Wolfgang Schwarz
 1988–1989: Willi Törnig
 1990: Friedrich Hirzebruch
 1991–1992: Winfried Scharlau
 1993–1994: Martin Grötschel
 1995–1997: Ina Kersten
 1998–1999: Karl-Heinz Hoffmann
 2000–2001: Gernot Stroth
 2002–2003: Peter Gritzmann
 2004–2005: Günther Wildenhain
 2006–2008: Günter M. Ziegler
 2009–2010: Wolfgang Lück
 2011–2012: Christian Bär
 2013–2014: Jürg Kramer
 2015–2016: Volker Bach
 2017–2018: Michael Röckner
 2019–2020: Friedrich Götze
 2021–2022: Ilka Agricola

See also
List of Mathematical Societies

References

1890 establishments in Germany
Mathematical societies
Scientific societies based in Germany